A Decade with Duke is a live music CD featuring Justin Vernon from Bon Iver in collaboration with the Eau Claire Memorial Jazz I Ensemble directed by Bruce Hering. Steve Thompson of National Public Radio's All Things Considered ranked the album as his sixth favorite of 2010.

References 

2009 live albums
Live jazz albums
Collaborative albums